Jean Alexandru Steriadi (29 October 1880 – 23 November 1956) was a Romanian painter and drawing artist. He made portraits and compositions based on a strong, expressive drawing; then he evolved towards impressionistic influenced landscapes in which the subtle harmony is combined with a refined sense of picturesque ("The Morizzi House", "Ships in the Brăila Harbour"). Jean Alexandru Steriadi was a titular member of the Romanian Academy from 1948.

Gallery

References

1880 births
1956 deaths
Artists from Bucharest
20th-century Romanian painters
Titular members of the Romanian Academy
Academic staff of the Bucharest National University of Arts